The following is a sortable table of U.S. state and federal district historical societies and history museums.


Table

See also

List of historical societies
Lists of U.S. state topics

External links

 U.S. State Historical Societies And Museums
U.S. State Historical Societies And Museums
State Historical Societies And Museums
Historical Societies And Museums
Historical Societies And Museums
State